Sandra Lyng Haugen (born 18 April 1987) is a Norwegian singer.

Biography 
Sandra Lyng Haugen is from the town of Mosjøen in the municipality of Vefsn. She rose to popularity in 2004 after her participation in the  Norwegian TV2 program Idol: Jakten på en superstjerne, the Norwegian version of Pop Idol, in which she placed fourth.

Sandra released her debut single the summer hit "Sommerflørt" in 2004, singing with Equicez member Phillip. 
In 2005, she released the single "I morgen", which stayed in the Norwegian charts for 16 weeks, peaking at number 2. Sandra also released the album Døgnvill under the Universal Norway label in 2005. Døgnvill stayed in the charts for 9 weeks, peaking at No. 10, which is a longer period of time than Kjartan Salvesen, who won Sandra's season, charted. In September 2013, Sandra released single "PRTeY" featuring rapper Lazee.

In 4 January 2023, it was announced that she will participate in Melodi Grand Prix 2023 with the song "Drøm D Bort".

Idol performances 
Auditions: "Foolish Games" (Jewel) / "Think Twice" (Celine Dion)
Semi-finals: "My Immortal" (Evanescence)
Top 11: "Panic" (Venke Knutson)
Top 9: "Mysteriet Deg" (Lisa Nilsson)
Top 8: "We Are Family" (Sister Sledge)
Top 7: "(I Just) Died in Your Arms" (Cutting Crew)
Top 6: "Love Don't Cost a Thing" (Jennifer Lopez)
Top 5: "Love"
Top 4: "Can't Fight the Moonlight" (LeAnn Rimes)/"(Everything I Do) I Do It for You" (Bryan Adams)

Discography

Albums

Other collective albums
2004: Idol: De Elleve Finalistene

Singles

References

External links

1987 births
Living people
Musicians from Vefsn
Norwegian pop singers
Norwegian-language singers
Idol (Norwegian TV series) participants
English-language singers from Norway
21st-century Norwegian singers
21st-century Norwegian women singers